The  Denver Broncos season was the team's 28th year in professional football and its 18th with the National Football League (NFL). Games scheduled during the third week of the season were cancelled, and games played from weeks 4 to 6 were played with replacement teams. The Broncos finished first in the AFC West, and were AFC Champions for the second straight year. Quarterback John Elway was voted league MVP for 1987. The Broncos reached the Super Bowl for the second consecutive season, but lost for the second straight time, 42-10 to the Washington Redskins.

Offseason

NFL Draft

Personnel

Staff

Roster

NFL replacement players
After the league decided to use replacement players during the NFLPA strike, the following team was assembled:

Regular season

Schedule

Game summaries

Week 1

    
    
    
    
    
    
    
    
    
    
    

John Elway 22/32, 338 Yds, 4 TD, INT

Week 2

Week 4

Week 5

Week 6

Week 7

Week 8

Week 9

Week 10

Week 11

Week 12

Week 13

Week 14

Week 15

Week 16

Standings

Playoffs

Divisional

Conference Championship

Super Bowl

Awards and records
Ricky Nattiel, All-Rookie selection

References

External links
Denver Broncos – 1987 media guide
 1987 Denver Broncos at Pro-Football-Reference.com

Denver Broncos
AFC West championship seasons
American Football Conference championship seasons
Denver Broncos seasons
Denver Bronco